Nonymodiadelia is a genus of beetles in the family Cerambycidae, containing the following species:

 Nonymodiadelia fuscovaria Breuning, 1957
 Nonymodiadelia lineatopunctata Breuning, 1957

References

Acanthocinini